Modi is a village and a community of the Volvi municipality. Before the 2011 local government reform it was part of the municipality of Madytos, of which it was a municipal district and the seat. The 2011 census recorded 349 inhabitants in the village. The community of Modi covers an area of 22.504 km2.

See also
 List of settlements in the Thessaloniki regional unit

References

Populated places in Thessaloniki (regional unit)